The 1991–92 Campbell Fighting Camels basketball team represented Campbell University during the 1991–92 NCAA Division I men's basketball season. The Fighting Camels, led by seventh-year head coach Billy Lee, played their home games at Carter Gymnasium in Buies Creek, North Carolina as members of the Big South Conference. The team finished in third place in the conference regular season standings, and would go on to win the Big South tournament to earn an automatic bid to the NCAA tournament. As No. 16 seed in the East region, the Fighting Camels lost in the opening round to defending champion (and eventual repeat champion) Duke, 82–56. Campbell finished with a record of 19–12 (7–7 Big South).

To date, this season marks the school's only appearance in the NCAA Tournament.

Roster

Schedule and results 

|-
!colspan=12 style=| Non-conference regular season

|-
!colspan=12 style=| Big South Conference regular season

|-
!colspan=12 style=| Big South tournament

|-
!colspan=12 style=| NCAA tournament

|-

Source

References

Campbell Fighting Camels basketball seasons
Campbell Fighting Camels
Campbell Fighting Camels basketball
Campbell Fighting Camels basketball
Campbell